Martin Eder (born 31 August 1968 in Augsburg) is a German artist.

From 1986 until 1992, he studied at the Augsburg University of Applied Sciences, and from 1993 until 1995 continued his studies at the Academy of Fine Arts Nuremberg, attending the University of Kassel in 1995 and 1996. From 1996 until 1999 he studied under Eberhard Bosslet at the Dresden Academy of Fine Arts and was a master student under Professor Bosslet from 1991 until 2001. Eder lives and works in Berlin. He plays in his own experimental rock band under the name Richard Ruin et Les Demoniaques.

References

Further reading 

 "Visuell 25. Fünfundzwanzig Jahre Sammlung Deutsche Bank", published by the Deutsche Guggenheim (as part of the exhibition commemorating the 25th anniversary of the collection, 30 April – 19 June 2005), Berlin 2005, S. 80.
 "Martin Eder: Die Kalte Kraft", published by the Kunstverein Lingen Kunsthalle (as part of the exhibition of the same name of the Kunstverein Lingen Kunsthalle, 15 August 2004 – 10 October 2004), Ostfildern-Ruit 2004, .
 "Martin Eder. Memoirs of My Nervous Illness", published by the Brandenburgischen Kunstverein Potsdam e.V (as part of the exhibition: Martin Eder "Phantasie der Erwachsenen," Brandenburgischer Kunstverein, 14 February 2003 – 14 March 2003), Potsdam 2003.
 "2003 Kunstpreis der Böttcherstraße in Bremen", published by the Stifterkreis für den Kunstpreis der Böttcherstraße in Bremen (as part of the exhibition "Kunstpreis der Böttcherstraße in Bremen," 2 March 2003 – 13 April 2003), Bramsche 2003.
 "The Undead" (part of the solo exhibition of Martin Eder), 2001.
 "Something Slightly Different/ From The Beginning After The End...", published by the Phillip Morris New York Foundation.
 "The Return Of The Anti-Soft", published by the Städtische Kunstsammlungen Augsburg (as part of the Eder exhibition "Forever isn't very long"), Augsburg 2001.

1968 births
Living people
Academy of Fine Arts, Nuremberg alumni
German contemporary artists